Nell Hall and Harry Hopman were the defending champions and the second seeds, but they lost in the semifinals.

The first-seeded Marjorie Crawford and Jack Crawford defeated unseeded Emily Hood Westacott and Aubrey Willard 7–5, 6–4 in the final, to win the mixed doubles tennis title at the 1931 Australian Championships.

Seeds

  Marjorie Crawford /  Jack Crawford (champions)
  Nell Hall /  Harry Hopman (semifinals)
  Louie Bickerton /  James Willard (quarterfinals)
  Sylvia Harper /  Gar Moon (quarterfinals)

Draw

Finals

Earlier rounds

Section 1

Section 2

Notes

a Because of rain this match had to be ceased with the score at one set all. It was scheduled to resume the next day, but Mrs. Harper severely strained a muscle of a leg in the preceding semifinal of the women's singles and had to withdraw.
 Probably either Robert K. Thomas or George Thomas – both played in the men's singles and doubles events.
 Most likely William Bruce Walker who played in the men's singles and doubles events.

References

External links
  Source for seedings

1931 in Australian tennis
Mixed Doubles